Meyr is a surname. Notable people with the surname include:

 Melchior Meyr, German poet, novelist and philosopher
 Wilhelm Meyr, Jesuit missionary, died at sea in 1699 or 1700 during a voyage with Johann Ernst Hanxleden to the Middle East and Asia

See also 
Myer (disambiguation)
Meir (disambiguation)
Mayr
Meyer (disambiguation)
Von Meyer
Meier
Maier
Mayer (disambiguation)
Mair (disambiguation)
Myers
Meyers

German-language surnames
Jewish surnames
Yiddish-language surnames